The SIAI-Marchetti S.205 is an Italian four-seat, single-engine, light airplane, manufactured by SIAI-Marchetti. The S.205 made its maiden flight in 1965. The Italian Air Force employs a version called S.208.

Development
The S.205 was the brainchild of the SIAI-Marchetti head designer Alexander Brena in 1964. Brena wanted to make a light, general-purpose aircraft, which led to the S.205. The aircraft was all-metal, low-winged, single-engined and provided space for four persons. Further development led into the S.208, which had a 260 hp engine, retractable landing gear, and 5 seats. Other planned, but never realized versions were the S.206 and S.210.

Approximately 65 fuselages were transported to the United States, to be assembled in Syracuse, New York by the Waco Aircraft Company.  With the death of Mr. Berger, the president of the company, the assembly of the S.205 came to a halt in the US.

Operational history

The Italian Air Force acquired 45 aircraft for use as liaison, glider-towing, and training aircraft. The military version, called S.208M, differed from the civil version through its avionics, its two doors for the cockpit, the possibility to mount a hook to tow gliders, and the lack of some fuel tanks. The first 4 delivered aircraft were S.205s, but were later converted into S.208s.

Two aircraft were also sold to Tunisia, who used them for pilot training.

Many S.205 aircraft were purchased by private pilot owners in Europe and elsewhere.

Variants
S.205 basic version, metal, single-engine four-seat airplane, the F version had a fixed undercarriage, while the R version had a retractable undercarriage. It was offered with three different engines:
S.205 F/R-18: Avco Lycoming O-360
S.205 F/R-20: Avco Lycoming IO-360-A1A
S.205 F/R-22: Franklin 6A-350C1
S.206 6-seat version, never realized
S.208 5-seat version with a 260 hp engine and a retractable undercarriage
S.208M military version for the Italian Air Force
S.208AG agricultural version, also used as an aviation-ambulance.
S.210 twin-engine version.

Operators

Civil
The aircraft has been registered in some 27 countries in Europe, Africa, the Americas and Australia.

Military

Ethiopian Air Force

Italian Air Force  operates 44 SIAI-Marchetti S.208M since 1968

Tunisian Air Force

Specifications (S.205-20/R)

See also

References

S.205
1960s Italian military utility aircraft
Low-wing aircraft
Single-engined tractor aircraft
Aircraft first flown in 1965